Gregor Brown (born 1 July 2001) is a Scottish rugby union player for Glasgow Warriors in the Pro14. Brown's primary position is lock or flanker.

Rugby Union career

Amateur career

Brown was a pupil at Robert Gordon's College in Aberdeen and played rugby for them.

He also played for Aberdeen side Gordonians.

Professional career

He joined the Boroughmuir Bears for the 2019-20 season of the Super 6 tournament.

Brown was named as a member of the Glasgow Warriors academy for the 2020–21 season. He made his debut for Glasgow Warriors in Round 13 of the 2020–21 Pro14 against . He became Glasgow Warrior No. 324.

International career

He has represented Scotland U18; and made his debut for the Scotland U20 side in the opening fixture of the 2020 U20 Six Nations tournament.

References

External links
itsrugby.co.uk Profile
 Glasgow Warriors Profile

2001 births
Living people
Glasgow Warriors players
Rugby union locks
Rugby union flankers
Rugby union players from Aberdeen
Scottish rugby union players